Wasa Mayu (Quechua wasa the human back or the back of an animal, mayu river, "back river" hispanicized spelling Huasa Mayu) is a Bolivian river in the Cochabamba Department, Tiraque Province, Tiraque Municipality and in the Carrasco Province. It is a left tributary of Ivirizu River, the most important affluent of San Matéo River.

See also
List of rivers of Bolivia

References

Rivers of Cochabamba Department